The following is a list of episodes for the television show Agter Elke Man.


Series overview

Season 1: 1985-1986
Season 1, consisting of 30 episodes, first premiered in South Africa on  TV1  on September 5, 1985, and ended on March 27, 1986 .

Season 2: 1988
Season 2, consisting of 36 episodes, first premiered in South Africa on  TV1  on March 10, 1988, and ended on November 10, 1988 .
Premiered on Sabc encore November 2015 and conclude August, 2, 2016

Agter Elke Man episodes